China–Turkmenistan relations are the bilateral relationship between China and Turkmenistan.

China is the first country to establish diplomatic relations with Turkmenistan. On January 6, 1992, China signed communiqués on the establishment of diplomatic relations with Turkmenistan.

In 2020, the China exports to Turkmenistan were valued at $445 US million and Turkmenistan exports to China were valued at $5.3 US billion.

See also
 Central Asia–China gas pipeline

References 

 
Turkmenistan
China